Villanueva del Campillo is a municipality located in the province of Ávila, Castile and León, Spain. According to the 2006 census (INE), the municipality has a population of 156 inhabitants.

The village is famous for its verraco, an ancient sculpture, which was found half-buried.  The verraco has been reerected in the plaza mayor:  the rear part of the animal was missing and has been reconstructed.

Notable people
Ricardo Blázquez (born 1942), prelate of the Catholic Church

References

Municipalities in the Province of Ávila